Varnajalam is a 2004 Indian Tamil-language mystery thriller film written and directed by Nagulan Ponnusamy. The film stars Srikanth, Sadha, and Kutti Radhika, while Nassar, Riyaz Khan, and Karunas play supporting roles. The music was composed by Vidyasagar and editing done by K. Palanivel and cinematography by B. Balamurugan. The film was released on 13 February 2004 and was declared 'hit' at the box office due to its unique story and action sequences. The film was later dubbed in Hindi as Aankhein.

Plot
Devanathan IPS (Nassar), the Commissioner of Chennai Police, retires and begins a new life with his family, which includes his brother Shekar (Thalaivasal Vijay), sister-in-law Viji (Kanchana Mendis), and their children. Devanathan buys two large tea estates in Ooty and moves in with his family there. Devanathan's daughter Anitha (Kutty Radhika) is a teenager who wants to become a sincere IPS officer like her father, and his son Ashwin (Anand Samy) is a brilliant, yet troubled and antisocial young man. One morning, a young man named Daniel (Srikanth) arrives with a recommendation letter from a recently dead priest, Father Andrews, who is a schoolmate of Devanathan, to apply for a job as a tea estate manager. Daniel slowly becomes a favorite of the family with his good nature, music skills, and along with the fact that he saves Devanathan's life from criminals, and wins the family's heart.

One night, Ashwin scares Devanathan by dressing himself as a stalker. Ashwin got chased by Devanathan and revealed his identity to him, while laughing insanely and madly at Devanathan. The next day, Ashwin drives too fast, almost kills the family from getting hit by a train, frightening them. He then gets into an argument with Devanathan and goes to Daniel's office. Daniel, while acting insanely, inflicts wounds on himself and blames it on Ashwin. Ashwin attempts to confront Daniel over this scene at the hospital that Daniel is recovering from. Daniel created a scene that fabricated Ashwin attempting to murder Daniel for presumably having an affair with Anitha. Ashwin was captured by the ward boys and guarded in the hospital. Daniel was discharged and stayed alone at Devanathan's house. Ashwin escapes his hospital room by locking Shekar, who was guarding him in the washroom, and confronts Daniel again at his home. Daniel starts a fire in the cabin, where all of Devanathan's awards and medals, blaming all of that on Ashwin. Ashwin attempted to stop and expose Daniel but was unsuccessful and is taken to a mental hospital. Daniel disguises himself as Devanathan by wearing his cap and black coat while spying on Viji when she is bathing. She thinks it was Devanathan, and the friction between the brothers starts, which grows to an end level when Shekar leaves the house with his family.

Months later, one noon, while riding her scooter, Anitha discovers Daniel's jeep and is shocked to see him performing Hindu rituals for a woman named Abhirami (Sadha). Daniel reveals himself to be Shakthivel, a painter, who was raised up by his elder sister Karthiga (Saranya Ponvannan) and brother-in-law (Nizhalgal Ravi). He was academically very brilliant, but when his brother-in-law suffered from paralysis, he voluntarily gave up his school studies and became a painter. He and his sister's daughter Abhirami were in love. Abhirami enrolled herself in a medical college to become a doctor as her wish, while Shakthi covered the expenses and fee payments. Abhirami's parents plan their marriage after Abhirami finishes college. On Devanathan's last day in service, a junior officer, ACP Prabhakaran IPS (Ajay Rathnam), requests him permission to perform an encounter operation on a famous rowdy called Royapuram Guna (Riyaz Khan). Unbeknownst to anyone in particular, Devanathan is under Guna's payroll. Though Devanathan refuses permission, the Home minister overrides him, and the operation is carried out near a bus stop, where Abhirami was standing. Guna escapes due to Devanathan's prior given information to him, but Abhirami is killed in the crossfire of the shootout between Guna and his gang against the police. To save their names, Devanathan places Guna's photo inside Abhirami's work folder and fabricated her as like his lover. Shakthi is innocently arrested and sentenced for about six months in imprisonment for beating up policemen who came to question him and Abhirami's parents for Guna's whereabouts, while Abhirami's parents commit suicide over humiliation of the false fact of Abhirami being Guna's lover. Devanathan retires with honors. Prabhakaran who was guest visiting the prison that Shakthi was imprisoned in and revealed to him the truth when confronted by Shakthi and apologizes to him over being unable to do anything to reveal the truth, due to the fact that Devanathan was his superior officer and had connections at top level.

Anitha could not believe it at first, but Shakthi forcibly took her to the guest house that Devanathan brought and showed her him chatting on an escape plan for Guna and his friend, who were hiding in Ooty, aided by Devanathan to escape from the authorities. She was shocked to learn that her father is a murderer and runs away from Shakthi. Guna and his friend are about to escape to Ooty in a vehicle driven by Devanathan himself to avoid unnecessary checking. Shakthi chases them, and when they are about to cross a check post, he shoots at the car. Guna and his friend mistakenly thought it was police firing, so they came out and start firing, which triggers the actual and real police to come to the spot and kill Devanathan and the criminals in the shootout. Shakthi revealed his identity to Devanathan before he died, while stating that having him killed in the same way Abhirami was killed is Shakthi's punishment to him.

At the film's end, Shakthi is seen sitting in a bus leaving Ooty reading an article on a newspaper of Devanathan's death, with Anitha revealing the truth about her father being a criminal to the entire world written in it.

Cast 

 Srikanth as Daniel alias Shakthivel (Shakthi), the protagonist
 Sadha as Abhirami, Shakthivel's niece and lady love who dies in a shootout
 Kutty Radhika as Anitha, Devanathan's youngest child and daughter
 Nassar as Devanathan IPS, a retired JCP and the main antagonist
 Anandsami as Ashwin, Devanathan's eldest child and son
 Riyaz Khan as Royapuram Guna, Devanathan's sidekick
 Saranya Ponvannan as Karthiga, Shakthivel's elder sister and Abhirami's mother
 Nizhalgal Ravi as Shakthivel's brother-in-law and Abhirami's father
 Thalaivasal Vijay as Shekar, Devanathan's younger brother
 Kanchana Mendis as Viji, Devanathan's sister-in-law
 Karunas as Logu
 Soori as Thief
 Ajay Rathnam as ACP Prabhakaran IPS
 Ilavarasu as Police Constable
 Chitti Babu as Wine Shop Owner
 Crane Manohar as Drunkard
 Sridhar in a special appearance in the song "Matha Matha"

Soundtrack
The soundtrack of the film was composed by Vidyasagar.

Production
The film was shot for nearly 25 days in Sri Lanka, 15 days in Ooty and 20 days in Chennai. Director Nagulan Ponnusaamy, who earlier worked as an assistant to G. M. Kumar and Raj Kapoor and worked as dialogue writer, made his debut as director with this film.

Release and reception
The film was declared as a hit at the box-office. Nagulan Ponnusaamy had not directed any film so far, and due to the film's success, he became popular before resurfacing as an actor by playing Karu Pazhaniappan's father in his film Mandhira Punnagai.

The film received positive reviews. Hindu wrote:"On the face of it GJ Cinema's "Varnajaalam" (the title is a well-thought out one) is just another tale of revenge. But Nakulan Ponnusamy's treatment gives new dimensions to the narration. Though it is a thriller of sorts surprisingly the film has very few action scenes. But fear and suspense continue to mount at every stage, till the climax". Another critic wrote:"nothing new to offer as it lacks style, newness or a tautness of a thriller". Balaji wrote:"its slow pace and lack of suspense and tension prevent it from becoming a successful entry". Bizhat wrote:"the first half lacks consistency. The screenplay is a bit slow and most of the scenes are predictable. But the second half is neat and fast paced".

References

External links 

Films shot in Ooty
2004 crime thriller films
Indian films about revenge
2004 films
2000s Tamil-language films
Indian crime thriller films
Films scored by Vidyasagar
2004 directorial debut films